American Beauty: Original Motion Picture Score is the recording of the original score for the 1999 film, composed by Thomas Newman. The original music accompanied 11 pre-existing songs by other artists.

Description
The film was nominated for the Academy Award for Original Music Score (but lost to the score of The Red Violin) and the Golden Globe Award for Best Original Score (but lost to the score of The Legend of 1900), and won the Anthony Asquith Award for Film Music in the BAFTA Awards.

The score album won the Grammy Award for the Best Score Soundtrack Album for a Motion Picture, Television or other Visual Media in 2001 which was awarded to producer Bill Bernstein, engineer Dennis Sands, and Newman.

A soundtrack album for the film was also released, on October 5, 1999, entitled American Beauty: Music from the Original Motion Picture Soundtrack. That album includes songs by ten of the eleven artists (Annie Lennox's rendition of "Don't Let It Bring You Down" being absent) and two excerpts from the film's score: "Dead Already" and "Any Other Name".

Track listing

See also
 American Beauty
 American Beauty soundtrack

References

Film scores
2000s film soundtrack albums